The Danish national baroque orchestra Concerto Copenhagen is one of the leading baroque orchestras in the world.

History 
Danish National Baroque Orchestra Concerto Copenhagen played its first concerts in 1991 and has since developed into the leading baroque orchestra in Scandinavia.

Since 1999 the orchestra has been directed by harpsichordist Lars Ulrik Mortensen.

The orchestra combines a repertoire of well known European music and lesser known works of Scandinavian origin.

Through the years Concerto Copenhagen has collaborated with many international artist like Emma Kirkby, Andreas Scholl, Anne Sofie von Otter, Sonia Prina, Vivica Genaux, Andrew Manze, Andrew Lawrence-King, Reinhard Goebel, Ronald Brautigam, Jordi Savall og Alfredo Bernardini.

Between 2015 and 2017, Danish composer Karl Aage Rasmussen was linked to Concerto Copenhagen as composer-in-residence.

Concerto Copenhagen has released recordings on CPO, Deutsche Grammophon and BIS, as well as DVD productions on Harmonia Mundi and Decca.

The orchestra has toured USA, Japan, Brazil, Mexico, Australia and China.

Concerto Copenhagen is supported by the Danish Arts Foundation.

Artistic Leader 
Lars Ulrik Mortensen (born 1955) has been artistic director of the orchestra since 1999.

Mortensen studied with Karen Englund (harpsichord) and Jesper Bøje Christensen (figured bass) at The Royal Danish Academy of Music in Copenhagen and with Trevor Pinnock in London.

As a soloist and chamber musician, Mortensen has toured all over Europe, USA, Mexico, South America, Australia, China and Japan.

Mortensen was professor of harpsichord and performance practice at the Hochschule für Musik und Theater in Munich from 1996 to 1999. In 2007 he was awarded the Léonie Sonning Music Prize, Denmark's premier music award.

Discografy 
 K.AA. Rasmussen: The Four Seasons After Vivaldi (Dacapo, 2019)
 J.S. Bach: Brandenburg Concertos (CPO, 2018
 Bo Holten: Gesualdo - Shadows (Dacapo, 2018)
 N.W. Gade: The Elf King's Daughter (Dacapo, 2018)
 J.S. Bach: Harpsichord Concertos Vol. 3 (CPO, 2015)
 J.S. Bach: Mass in B Minor (CPO, 2015)
 J.S. Bach: Violin Concertos BWV 1041–1043 & 1060R (CPO, 2014)
 G.F. Händel: Concerti Grossi, Op. 3 Nos. 1–6 (CPO, 2010)
 G.F. Händel: Partenope (Decca, 2009)
 J.S. Bach: Vocal Works (Deutsche Grammophon, 2009)
 G.F. Händel: Giulio Cesare (Harmonia Mundi, 2007)
 J.G.W. Palschau, J.A.P. Schulz: Harpsichord Concertos (Dacapo, 2007)
 J.S. Bach: Harpsichord Concertos Vol 2. (CPO, 2006)
 G. Gerson, F.L.Æ. Kunzen: Symphonies (CPO, 2005)
 J. Haydn: Keyboard Concertos (BIS, 2004)
 J.S. Bach: Harpsichord Concertos Vol. 1 (CPO, 2003)
 J.E. Hartmann: Complete Symphonies (CPO, 2003)
 C.E.F. Weyse: Symphonies 1 & 7 (Classico, 2002)
 J.A. Scheibe: Sinfonias (Chandos, 1994)
 Scheibe, Agrell & Hasse: Flute Concertos (Chandos, 1993)

External references 
Concerto Copenhagens hjemmeside
Concerto Copenhagen på Facebook

1991 establishments in Denmark
Musical groups established in 1991
Early music orchestras
Danish orchestras
Music in Copenhagen
Organizations based in Copenhagen